The captain of a cricket team, often referred to as the skipper, is the appointed leader, having several additional roles and responsibilities over and above those of the other players. As in other sports, the captain is usually experienced and has good communication skills, and is likely to be one of the most regular members of the team, as the captain is responsible for the team selection. Before the game the captains toss for innings. During the match the captain decides the team's batting order, who will bowl each over, and where each fielder will be positioned. While the captain has the final say, decisions are often collaborative. A captain's knowledge of the complexities of cricket strategy and tactics, and shrewdness in the field, may contribute significantly to the team's success.

Due to the smaller coaching/management role played out by support staff, as well as the need for greater on-field decision-making, the captain of a cricket team typically shoulders more responsibility for results than team captains in other sports.

Captain's responsibilities

During a match

The toss
Starting from team selection and then toss
Before the start of a match the home captain tosses a coin and the away captain calls heads or tails.  The captain who wins the toss is given the choice of whether to bat or bowl first. The decision usually depends on the condition of the pitch and whether it is likely to deteriorate, the weather conditions and the weather forecast.

The decision also depends on the relative strengths of the team's batting and bowling. For instance in Test cricket, a side with only fast bowlers may choose to bowl first to try to take advantage of any early moisture in the pitch, knowing that it will be harder to take wickets later in the match. Similarly a side with a weak opening batting pair may choose to bowl first in order to protect their batsmen.

Fielding positions
The captain decides where the fielders will stand, in consultation with the bowler and sometimes other senior players.  The fielding positions will usually be dictated by the type of bowler, the batsman's batting style, and the captain's assessment of the state of the match (and hence whether to set an attacking or a defensive field).

Bowling
The captain decides when each bowler will bowl.  If a batsman is seeking to dominate the current bowler, the captain may ask someone else to bowl; alternatively, keeping the bowler on may be deemed the best chance of getting the batsman out or restricting the scoring rate. If the regular bowlers are not achieving the desired results, the captain may decide to use non-regular bowlers to attempt to unsettle the batsmen.  The captain may also change the bowlers around to introduce variation, and to prevent the batsmen getting "set".

In limited overs cricket the captain additionally has to make certain that bowlers bowl no more than their allotted maximum number of overs, and that experienced bowlers are available at the end of the batting side's innings, when the batsmen are usually looking to take risks to attack and score quickly.

In the longer forms of cricket, when a new ball becomes available the captain decides whether to use it, and when given that it can be taken any time after it becomes available.

Batting order

When the team bats, the captain decides the batting order. In professional cricket the captain usually changes the established batting order only for exceptional reasons, because batsmen tend to specialise in batting at certain positions. However, in certain circumstances it may be in the team's interest to change the batting order. If quick runs are needed, a naturally attacking batsman may be promoted up the order. A player who is 'in form' may be promoted to a higher batting position, at the expense of a player who is 'out of form'.

If a wicket falls near the end of a day's play, especially if the light is failing, or if the bowlers seem particularly confident, the captain may choose to send in a non-specialist batsman, referred to as a nightwatchman. If the nightwatchman does not get out before the end of that day's play then the specialist batsman will have been protected, and will not need to bat until the following day when conditions are likely to have improved. If the nightwatchman does get out, the cost of losing a late wicket will have been minimised, because the specialist batsman is still available to bat.

Declarations
The captain may declare the team's innings closed at any time, but usually only does so as an attacking ploy, for instance if the captain thinks the team has enough runs to win the match, or if a sudden change in conditions has made it advantageous to bowl rather than bat.

Follow-on
In a two-innings match, if the situation arises the captain decides whether to impose the follow-on.

Miscellaneous
The captain is also consulted on whether an injured batsman from the opposing team may use a runner when batting.  Permission is usually given if the batsman has become injured during the course of the match, but if the batsman was carrying the injury at the start of the match then the captain may refuse. (As of 2012, runners are not allowed in Test cricket and injured batsmen are required to continue batting with the injury or retire hurt.)

Other duties
As well as decisions taken either immediately before or during a match, captains also often have some responsibility for the good running of the cricket club. For instance, they may decide when the team is to practise, and for how long. In professional cricket the captain often has some say in who will form the squad from which teams are selected, and may also decide how young up-and-coming players are to be encouraged and improved, and how members of the squad who are not regularly selected for first-team matches are to gain match practice.

Prior to July 2015, the captain was responsible for deciding when to take batting and bowling powerplays in limited overs matches.

Vice-captain
The captain may be assisted by a vice-captain or in some instances joint vice-captains. This is particularly useful if the captain is forced to leave the field of play during fielding. Some teams also allocate the vice-captain a more or less formal role in assisting with team selection, discipline, field-setting and so on. Sometimes the role of vice-captain is seen as preparation for the player(s) becoming the captain of the side in future.

Current men's international captains

ICC Full Members

Associate Members

Current women's international captains

ICC Full Members

Associate Members

See also
 The Art of Captaincy, a 1985 book by former England captain Mike Brearley

References

External links

Cricket terminology
Leadership positions in sports
Cricket captaincy and tactics
Sports captains
Cricket